Since its inception in 1954, Sports Illustrated has annually presented the Sportsman of the Year award to "the athlete or team whose performance that year most embodies the spirit of sportsmanship and achievement." Both Americans and non-Americans are eligible, though in the past the vast majority of winners have been from the United States. Both men and women have won the award, originally called "Sportsman of the Year" and renamed "Sportswoman of the Year" or "Sportswomen of the Year" when applicable.

Tiger Woods, Tom Brady, and LeBron James are the only individuals who have received the award more than once. Woods received his first award in 1996 as an amateur golfer, and in 2000 as a professional golfer. James received his first award in 2012, his second in 2016, and a third in 2020. Curt Schilling and Stephen Curry have won the award both individually and as part of a team.

The trophy is a ceramic replica of an ancient Greek amphora (c. 510 BCE) which depicts nude male Hellenistic athletes engaged in a variety of athletic activities—running, discus, and javelin.  It measures 8" in diameter and stands 18.5" high (20.32 x 47 cm). The original amphora was acquired by Sports Illustrated magazine in 1954 and was donated to the "Sports" collection of the Smithsonian's National Museum of American History in 1979. Winners of the award are now presented with a copy of the amphora made in silver by Tiffany & Co.

Winners 

The award's trophy, a ceramic urn depicting great athletes, has been given to the following recipients:
 Note: non-athlete individuals in Italics

See also

Sporting News Sportsman of the Year (1968 to 2008)
Sports Illustrated Top 20 Female Athletes of the Decade (2009)
Sports Illustrated Top 20 Male Athletes of the Decade (2009)
Athlete of the Year
Associated Press Athlete of the Year (AP)
ESPY Award
United Press International Athlete of the Year Award (UPI) (defunct)
Laureus World Sports Awards (Laureus World Sports Academy)
BBC Overseas Sports Personality of the Year
L'Équipe Champion of Champions

References

Sportsman of the Year
Sportsmanship trophies and awards
American sports trophies and awards
Annual magazine issues
Awards established in 1954